This is about the Colorado State park. For others, see Jackson Lake (disambiguation).
Jackson Lake State Park is located northeast of Orchard, Colorado in western Morgan County, Colorado.  It is situated on  Jackson reservoir that was built in the early 20th century.  The reservoir, elevation , receives water from the South Platte River and stores it for irrigation throughout the summer months.

The park offers 260 camping spaces, fishing, boating, and various other activities such as bird watching, hunting, and an OHV track.

References

External links

State parks of Colorado
Protected areas of Morgan County, Colorado
Protected areas established in 1965